The 2020–21 Liga I (also known as Casa Liga 1 for sponsorship reasons) was the 103rd season of the Liga I, the top professional league for Romanian association football clubs. The season started on 21 August 2020 and ended on 19 May 2021. CFR Cluj were winners and three-time defending champions. It was the sixth season to take place in the play-off/play-out format, and the first since the 2005–06 season to feature 16 teams.

The play-off/play-out rule was also altered, with the first six teams at the regular season qualified for the play-off tournament and the last ten for the play-out. The first six teams played two matches against each other as before, but in the play-out the teams only played once against each other. At the end of the play-out, the first two places (or the 7th and 8th overall) played a single match on the ground of the lower ranked team, and the subsequent winner played the last team ranked on a UEFA Europa Conference League spot in the play-off. The winner of the latter encounter qualified for the Europa Conference League.

The teams ranked 15th and 16th at the end of the play-out tournament were directly relegated, while the 13th and 14th places played a promotion/relegation play-off against 3rd and 4th places from Liga II.

Teams
The league consists of 16 teams: 13 from the 2019–20 Liga I, two teams from the 2019–20 Liga II, and the winner of the 2019–20 promotion/relegation play-off.

Teams promoted to the Liga I

The first club to be promoted was UTA Arad, following their 1–1 draw against FC Argeș on 2 August 2020. UTA returned in the Liga I after 12 years of absence.

The second club to be promoted was FC Argeș, following their 1–1 draw against UTA Arad on 2 August 2020. FC Argeș returned in the Liga I after 11 years of absence.

Teams relegated to the Liga II

No teams were relegated from the 2019–20 Liga I.

Initially, two clubs would have been relegated at the end of the 2019–20 Liga I season, with a third playing a relegation play-off with the 3rd-placed team from the 2019–20 Liga II. The first club to have been relegated would have been Chindia Târgoviște, following a 0–1 defeat on 2 August 2020 against Politehnica Iași, ending their 1-year stay in the top flight. However, owing to the effects of the COVID-19 pandemic on the previous season, the league table was frozen on 6 August 2020 and no teams were directly relegated. Instead, Chindia Târgoviște played a promotion/relegation play-off against CS Mioveni and kept their Liga I spot after a 3–1 aggregate result.

Venues

Personnel and kits

Note: Flags indicate national team as has been defined under FIFA eligibility rules. Players and Managers may hold more than one non-FIFA nationality.

Managerial changes

Regular season
In the regular season the 16 teams will meet twice for a total of 30 matches per team, with the top 6 advancing to the Championship play-offs and the bottom 10 qualifying for the relegation play-outs.

Table

Results

Positions by round

Play-off round
The top six teams from Regular season will meet twice (10 matches per team) for places in 2021–22 UEFA Champions League, 2021–22 UEFA Europa League, and 2021–22 UEFA Europa Conference League as well as deciding the league champion. Teams start the Championship round with their points from the Regular season halved, rounded upwards, and no other records carried over from the Regular season.

Play-off table

Positions by round

Play-out round
The bottom ten teams from the regular season meet once to contest against relegation. Teams started the play-out round with their points from the Regular season halved, rounded upwards, and no other records carried over from the Regular season. The winner of the Relegation round finish 7th in the overall season standings, the second placed team – 8th, and so on, with the last placed team in the Relegation round being 16th.

Play-out table

Positions by round

European play-offs
In the semi-final, the 7th and 8th-placed teams of the Liga I plays a one-legged match on the ground of the better placed team (7th place). In the final, the winner of the semi-final will encounter the team ranked on the last UEFA Europa Conference League spot in the play-off tournament. The winner of the final will enter the second qualifying round of the UEFA Europa Conference League.

European play-off semi-final

European play-off final

Promotion/relegation play-offs
The 13th and 14th-placed teams of the Liga I faces the 3rd and 4th-placed team of the Liga II.

First leg

Second leg

Season statistics

Top scorers
As of games played on 20 May 2021

Top assists
As of games played on 23 April 2021

Hat-tricks

Notes
(H) – Home team(A) – Away team

Double

Notes
(H) – Home team(A) – Away team

Clean sheets
As of games played on 23 April 2021

Discipline
As of games played on 16 February 2021

Player
 Most yellow cards: 9
  Ousmane Viera (Hermannstadt)
 Most red cards: 2
  Ondřej Bačo (Gaz Metan Mediaș)
  Alexandru Benga (UTA Arad)
  Valentin Gheorghe (Astra Giurgiu)
  Gabriel Matei (FC Argeș)

Team
 Most yellow cards: 74
 Hermannstadt
 Gaz Metan Mediaș
 Most red cards: 6
 Botoșani
 Fewest yellow cards: 34
 Universitatea Craiova
 Fewest red cards: 0
 CFR Cluj

Champion squad

Awards

Liga I Team of the Season

References

External links
 

2020-21
2020–21 in Romanian football
ro